Herbert "Happi" Prikopa (30 November 1935 – 8 December 2015) was an Austrian television presenter, conductor, operatic tenor, actor, composer, writer, pianist and cabaret artist.

Life and career 
Born in Vienna, in 1935, at the age of 19, Prikopa became the youngest répétiteur at the Wiener Volksoper. After a singing engagement at the Wiener Kammeroper he became a member of Gerhard Bronner's "" in the cabaret programm Brettl vorm Klavier. In 1957 a soloist contract was signed at the Volksoper instead of the répétiteur contract. From 1988 to 2009 Prikopa belonged to the radio cabaret team "". In the 1998/1999 to 2007/2008 seasons, Prikopa was musical director and conductor of the Johann Strauss Concert Gala in Vienna.

He was the presenter of the children's television programme  on the ORF in the 1980s. Here he appeared as Herbert Happi Prikopa.

On 21 March 2005, Prikopa received the  professor.

He died in Vienna on 8 December 2015 at age 80.

Filmography 
 1957: 
 1957: Sissi – Fateful Years of an Empress
 1960: My Niece Doesn't Do That
 1962: No Kissing Under Water (also co-storyboard)
 1963: Kaiser Joseph und die Bahnwärterstochter (director: Axel Corti)
 1963: Our Crazy Aunts in the South Seas
 1964: 
 1969–1970:  (television series)
 1972–1976: Die Abenteuer des braven Soldaten Schwejk (TV serial)
 1974: Das Land des Lächelns
 1975: Der Kommissar: Das Goldene Pflaster (television series)
 1977: Der Alte: Die Dienstreise (television series)
 1978: The Tailor from Ulm
 1978: Tatort –  (TV serials)
 1981: Wie Böhmen noch bei Österreich war (director: Franz Josef Gottlieb)
 1985: Der Leihopa (ORF - television series with Alfred Böhm
 1992: Kaisermühlen Blues
 1994: Mesmer
 1999: Eine fast perfekte Hochzeit (director: Reinhard Schwabenitzky)
 2001: Julia – Eine ungewöhnliche Frau (sequel Das Ende des Weges)
 2007: Oben ohne (TV serial, director: Reinhard Schwabenitzky)

Radio plays 
 1984: Otto Brusatti: Die letzten Stunden der Menschheit – director: Otto Brusatti (ORF/WDR)

Dissography (partial) 
 Gräfin Mariza, (Emmerich Kálmán)
 Die lustige Witwe, (Franz Lehár)
 Le Grand Macabre, (György Ligeti)

Some compositions 
 Classic Piano. 28 Kompositionen für Klavier
 Visit to Chimera
 Chimera
 The Pillars of the world
 Thinking Positively

Works 
 1994: Erich Kunz – Biographie des Sängers, together with Cornelia Szabó-Knotik, Löcker–Verlag Wien, 
 1998: 100 Jahre Volksoper – Die Geschichte eines notwendigen Theaters, Iberia-Verlag Vienna, 
 2003: Strauß-Führer durch Europa und die umliegenden Ortschaften, Iberia-Verlag Vienna,

Awards 
 1986: Decoration of Honour for Services to the Republic of Austria
 2011:

References

External links 
 
 Prikopa Herbert on Operissimo
 Herbert Prikopa Homepage
 
 

1935 births
2015 deaths
Musicians from Vienna
Austrian cabaret performers
Austrian male film actors
Austrian stage actors
Austrian screenwriters
Austrian television presenters
Austrian conductors (music)
Austrian pianists
Austrian operatic tenors
Austrian composers
Austrian non-fiction writers